Future is the second studio album by Dutch DJ Don Diablo. It was released on 9 February 2018 through his Hexagon label. Don had contributed his vocals to three of the sixteen songs on the album. Singers featured on the album include Ansel Elgort, Nina Nesbitt, Calum Scott, Betty Who, James Newman, Miles Graham, Holly Winter, Dave Thomas Junior, Paije and A R I Z O N A.

Background
Don revealed the title and release date of his first album since 2008's Life Is a Festival on his Snapchat story. He would be going on a tour of the same name in North America to promote the album. Previously released singles such as "People Say", "You Can't Change Me", "Take Her Place" and "Don't Let Go" are expected to be part of the album.

Don spoke about the album, he said "The upcoming album is all about pushing things forward, sonically and musically, taking things into the FUTURE in the broadest sense of the word." The sixth single "People Say" was debuted at the 2017 Ultra Music Festival in Miami in Don's stage performance. He also described the album as showing "a different side" of himself as a producer and artist.

In a week before the release of the album, Don live-streamed some songs from the album on his Facebook page. The live-stream featured Don performing his set inside a space shuttle provided, as a courtesy, by the European Space Agency.

Don spoke about the album, stating "I wanted this to be a motivational record that sonically showcases new ideas on a production level, ranging from future house to future pop and everything in between."

Commercial reception
Billboard described the album as a "beautiful 'good vibes' radiator, welcomes the summer." However, some of Don's fans described the lack of his unique future house sound as disappointing, and felt he was "straying away from his signature sound."

Track listing
All tracks produced by Don Diablo.

Charts

References

2018 albums
Don Diablo albums